The 12839 / 12840 Howrah–Chennai Mail is a Mail train of Indian Railways connecting Howrah Junction and Chennai Central. It connects three metropolitan cities of India, Kolkata, Chennai and Visakhapatnam. It also runs via some major cities of India like Bhubaneswar, Vijayawada etc.,

History
The train made its inaugural run on 15 August 1900, which makes it one of the oldest running trains on Indian Railways. It was first hauled by steam engines, including the WP class engines, then by diesel, and now by electric WAP-4 or WAP-7 locomotives. It was the first passenger train to be dieselised on South Eastern Railway, in 1964/65. Till the introduction of the Coromandel Express in the mid seventies, it was the main and fastest train link between Howrah and Chennai (then Madras)  with much fewer halts. Presently, this train is the second most important train on the Howrah–Chennai main line after the high speed Coromandel Express.

Rakes

 1 Fast class AC
 3 AC Two Tier
 8 AC Three Tier
 5 Sleeper class
 1 Pantry car
 2 General Unreserved
 1 End on Generation car (EOG)
 1 Sitting luggage cum brake van (SLR)

{| class="wikitable plainrowheaders unsortable" style="text-align:left"
|-
!scope="col" rowspan="1" style="background:white;"| Loco
!scope="col" rowspan="1" style="background:red;"| 1
!scope="col" rowspan="1" style="background:yellow;"| 2
!scope="col" rowspan="1" style="background:yellow;"| 3
!scope="col" rowspan="1" style="background:lightskyblue;"| 4
!scope="col" rowspan="1" style="background:lightskyblue;"| 5
!scope="col" rowspan="1" style="background:lightskyblue;"| 6
!scope="col" rowspan="1" style="background:lightskyblue;"| 7
!scope="col" rowspan="1" style="background:lightskyblue;"| 8
!scope="col" rowspan="1" style="background:pink;"| 9
!scope="col" rowspan="1" style="background:lime;"| 10
!scope="col" rowspan="1" style="background:lime;"| 11
!scope="col" rowspan="1" style="background:lime;"| 12
!scope="col" rowspan="1" style="background:lime;"| 13
!scope="col" rowspan="1" style="background:lime;"| 14
!scope="col" rowspan="1" style="background:lime;"| 15
!scope="col" rowspan="1" style="background:lime;"| 16
!scope="col" rowspan="1" style="background:lime;"| 17
!scope="col" rowspan="1" style="background:violet;"| 18
!scope="col" rowspan="1" style="background:violet;"| 19
!scope="col" rowspan="1" style="background:violet;"| 20
!scope="col" rowspan="1" style="background:orange;"| 21
!scope="col" rowspan="1" style="background:red;"| 22
|-
|
||SLR||GS||GS||S1||S2||S3||S4||S5||PC||B1||B2||B3||B4||B5||B6||B7||B8||A1||A2||A3||H1||EOG||

Route

References

Express trains in India
Mail trains in India
Rail transport in Andhra Pradesh
Rail transport in Odisha
Rail transport in Tamil Nadu
Rail transport in West Bengal
Railway services introduced in 1900
Transport in Chennai
Rail transport in Howrah